Devi Prasad (1921 – 1 June 2011) was an Indian artist and peace activist. He was a pioneering studio potter, painter, designer, photographer, art educator and peace activist.

Early life
Devi Prasad studied at Rabindranath Tagore's Shantiniketan and also at Sevagram.

Career, peace activism and death
A major exhibition, The Making of the Modern Indian Artist-Craftsman, was held in New Delhi in May 2010, wherein his works spanning 65 years beginning with some of Devi Prasad's earliest artworks – a selection of paintings made in Santiniketan in 1938 – and ends with a showcasing of some of the last (from 2003 to 2004) that were made the last time he used his studio in Delhi.
Naman Ahuja, who curated the exhibition, was an apprentice in his studio and has written extensively about his teacher remembering Prasad as a compassionate, deep-thinking person.
Devi Prasad was also a lifelong pacifist and peace activist promoting ideals of Mahatma Gandhi and Rabindranath Tagore.

He worked internationally with War Resisters' International (WRI) for several decades, serving in its London office as general secretary from 1962 to 1972 prior to his term as chair from 1972 to 1975. His history of the organization, War is a Crime Against Humanity: The story of War Resisters' International, was published in 2005.

Devi Prasad died in Delhi on 1 June 2011.

See also
 List of peace activists

References

External links
 Devi Prasad's interview
 Interview on Livemint

Indian male painters
Photographers from Uttar Pradesh
Indian anti-war activists
Indian potters
1921 births
2011 deaths
Indian art educators
20th-century Indian photographers
20th-century Indian painters
20th-century Indian male artists